Leonid Dodojonovich Reiman (Russian: Леонид Дододжонович Рейман; born 12 July 1957, in Leningrad) is a Russian businessman and government official, former Minister of Communications and Information Technologies of the Russian Federation. Leonid Reiman has been numerously rated most influential person in Russian telecom business with personal wealth over $1 bln., according to Finance magazine.

Biography 
Leonid Reiman was born on 12 July 1957 in Leningrad, his father, Dodojon Tadjiyev, is a Tajik and his mother, Ekaterina Reiman, is an Estonian German and teaches English.

Career 

 In 1979, Leonid Reiman graduated from the M.A. Bonch-Bruevich Leningrad Institute of Communications Technology (now SPbGUT - Saint-Petersburg State University of Telecommunications and IT).
 1979-1983, engineer and then section chief at the Leningrad city international telephone station.
 1983-1985, Leonid Reiman did a tour of compulsory military service.
 1985-1999, Reiman occupied leading positions in the Leningrad City Telephone Network (LGTS) / in 1993 renamed to St. Petersburg City Telephone Network (PTS).
 1988-1999, Deputy Chief of the LGTS/PTS for development; LGTS/PTS Chief Engineer, Director for International Relations, Director for Investitions and International Relations, First Deputy Director-General of Open JSC PTS.
 In 1992 Reiman entered the Board of Directors of Peterstar, the first non-state owned cell phone operator in Saint Petersburg co-founded in 1992 by ComPlus Holding.
 Early 1990s Reiman meets attorney Jeffrey Galmond who becomes an investment assistant to Reiman.
 In 1994, he joined the Board of Directors of the JSC Telecominvest.
 Lyudmila Putina represents OAO Telecominvest from 1998-1999 in Moscow after her husband the former deputy mayor of St Petersburg Vladimir Putin moved from St Petersburg to Moscow in 1997 and later became the Director of the successor to the KGB, the Federal Security Service in July 1998.
 As of June 1999, he was a member of the Boards of directors of the JSC Delta Telecom, JSC Neva Line, JSC Peterstar, Stankinbank, JSC St. Petersburg City Telephone Network, editorial JSC St. Petersburg Directories, JSC Interregional Transit Telecom, JSC North-West GSM, the Chairman of the Board of Directors of the JSC St. Petersburg International and TransTelecom and a member of the supervisory board of the JSC St. Petersburg Intercity International Telephone.
 From July 1999, state secretary, first deputy chairman of the State Committee for Telecommunications (Gostelecom).
 From August 1999, Gostelecom chairman.
 November 1999 – April 2004, Minister of Information and Communications of the Russian Federation.
 Since 26 June 2000, and up to 2010 Leonid Reiman is the Chairman of the Board of Directors of Open JSC Svyazinvest.
 March – May 2004, First Deputy Minister of Transport and Communications of the Russian Federation.
 Leonid Reiman was appointed Minister of Communications and Information Technologies of the Russian Federation on 20 May 2004, where he served until 12 May 2008.
 May 2008 – August 2010 – Adviser to the President of the Russian Federation, Secretary for Presidential Council of Information Society Development.
 March 2011 – Chairman of the supervisory board of Mandriva.

Founder of RIO-Center, now Institute of Contemporary Development (INSOR), Russian liberal think tank chaired by President Dmitry Medvedev.

Controversies
On 25 July 2000, Leonid Reiman issued the order No 130 "Concerning the introduction of technical means ensuring investigative activity (SORM) in phone, mobile, wireless communication and radio paging networks" stating that the FSB was no longer required to provide telecommunications and Internet companies documentation on targets of interest prior to accessing information.

During the early 2004 tax dispute in Russia by Gossvyaznadzor about VimpelCom OJSC and its wholly owned subsidiary Impulse Design Bureau OJSC, Leonid Reiman, as the Deputy Minister of Transport and Communications, stated that it is unclear how taxes are paid by the companies but requested that the two should merge. Megafon increased its market share in the key Moscow region while VimpelCom was held back from expanding into that region awaiting the courts to decide the tax issue. Alfa Group, which has a significant share in Vimpel, was involved in a dispute over ownership of Leonid Rozhetskin's LV Finance former 25% stake in MegaFon with IPOC International Growth Fund during VimpelCom's tax issue with the Russian government.

In 2004 the British businessman Anthony Georgiou claimed in a court affidavit lodged in a British Virgin Islands court that in 1992 Reiman had received a bribe of about a million US dollars from him.

During a Bermuda government supported audit of IPOC International Growth Fund Ltd's KPMG investigation in 2005, the top official has been named in a number of legal actions as Leonid Reiman, Russia’s telecommunications minister. Mr Reiman has denied the claims. In 2006, the beneficial owner of the IPOC International Growth Fund is Leonid Reiman according to a Zurich ruling by the International Chamber of Commerce.

On 15 December 2011, the Frankfurt am Main prosecutor's office and German criminal authorities named Reiman as a suspect in a 1990s money laundering scheme involving Commerzbank, his longtime attorney Jeffrey Galmond, and four employees of Commerzbank. The case had begun as an investigation into the looting of Russia during the 1990s.

In late 2013, Finnish officials with the National Bureau of Investigation or Keskusrikospoliisi (KRP)  implicated Reiman in a money laundering scheme with Sekom's founder, Andrei Titov, where $11 million were transferred through Sekom to Cyprus Albany Investment and then to the Bermuda IPOC International Growth Fund.

Honours and awards
 Order of Merit for the Fatherland;
3rd class (12 July 2007) – for outstanding contribution to the development of modern information technologies and the creation of the domestic telecommunications network
4th class (12 July 2005) – for great contribution to the development of the telecommunications industry of the country and many years of fruitful work
 Honoured Worker of Russian telecommunications
 RF Government Prize in Education and Science and Technology
 Winner of the annual international prize "Person of the Year" (2005)
 Winner of the highest legal prize "Themis" (2003)

References

External links
Interview with Mr. L. Reiman
Opening remarks by Mr Leonid Reyman, Minister of Communications and Informatization, Russian Federation. World Telecommunication Policy Forum 2001, 07.03.01
Official biography (In Russian)
V. Pribylovsky. The origin of Putin's oligarchy (In Russian)
A dossier by V. Pribylovsky (In Russian)

1957 births
Living people
1st class Active State Councillors of the Russian Federation
Businesspeople from Saint Petersburg
Government ministers of Russia
Svyazinvest
Recipients of the Order "For Merit to the Fatherland", 3rd class
Medvedev Administration personnel
Russian people of Tajik descent
Russian people of Estonian descent
Russian people of German descent